Aldinga Airfield (ICAO:YADG) is a small, uncontrolled regional airfield located in Aldinga, South Australia. The airfield serves as a regional port  and is privately owned and maintained.

History 
Aldinga Airfield was built in 1976 by a group of pilots who wanted an authentic airfield that could access the McLaren Vale wine region. The airfield received significant support from other pilots and aviators and was eventually built with a paved runway, and constructed parking areas.
Today the airfield is used mostly by private pilots, Adelaide Biplanes and people who are passing through from Kangaroo Island, Eyre Peninsula and other places. The airfield is outside the main Adelaide controlled airspace, making it easy for VFR pilots to operate in and out of the airfield. The airfield has over 50 parking hangars, most of which are privately owned. The perimeter of the airfield is housed with a hip-level fence, which gives an unblocked view of aircraft landing on the runways. However, especially on approach for runway 32, there are large trees and heavy shrubs close to the runway threshold, which can be tricky and dangerous for pilots who are landing or departing from that runway.

Facilities 
The airfield has four runways.

It is the only paved and marked runway at the aerodrome.

Runway 14/32 runs perpendicular to runway 03/21.

There are 2 other shorter grass runways, 08/26 and 18/36.
Aldinga Airfield has a parking facility, which offers overnight parking. There is also a café that is open 7 days a week and an avgas pump.

See also
List of airports in South Australia

References 

Airports in South Australia